The Corbin Terminal Subdivision is a railroad/yard that is owned by CSX Transportation in the U.S. State of Kentucky. The yard is located in Corbin, Kentucky. The KD Subdivision runs from the north and south of the Corbin Terminal Subdivision.

See also
 List of CSX Transportation lines

References

Corbin, Kentucky
CSX Transportation lines
Transportation in Knox County, Kentucky
Transportation in Whitley County, Kentucky